Md. Abu Zahir (মোঃ আবু জাহির) is a Bangladesh Awami League politician and the incumbent Member of Parliament from Habiganj-3.

Early life
Zahir was born on 3 March 1963. He went to law school and practiced law after graduation.

Career
Zahir was elected to Parliament on 5 January 2014 from Habiganj-3 as a Bangladesh Awami League candidate.
He is also the President of Habiganj District Awami League.

References

Awami League politicians
Living people
1963 births
10th Jatiya Sangsad members
11th Jatiya Sangsad members